Antoinette Martignoni (born Antoinette Bremner Walker December 8, 1918 – August 20, 2018) was an American artist who developed the "Inner Portrait" process that uses art as a self-help means to see hidden personal potential. Martignoni died in August 2018 at the age of 99.

Family 
Born as Antoinette B. Walker in Brooklyn, New York in December 1918, she was the great-granddaughter  of James McCune Smith, the first African-American medical doctor with a university degree in the United States.

Education 
Martignoni was the first graduate to receive the Applied Arts degree from the University of Pennsylvania in 1941. In addition, she received a Diploma in Illustration from the Pennsylvania Museum and School of Industrial Art, now known as the University of the Arts (Philadelphia).

Illustration career  
She was a creative director and partner at Koelling/Martignoni & Co., Westport, Connecticut, and later founder of Martignoni & Co., a graphics and illustration firm in Fairfield, Connecticut. Martignoni created illustrations for large United States corporations (such as Avis Rent A Car System, Pepsi, H. J. Heinz Company, Nabisco and Duracell). As an illustrator for some of the top engineering firms from the 1960s through the 1980s, Martignoni produced illustrations of futuristic engineering projects, such as the Boston Tunnel that became known as the Big Dig and America’s first people mover that was built at the West Virginia University. In 1973, Martignoni illustrated an instructional woodworking book by author Carolyn Meyer, Saw, Hammer, and Paint: Woodworking and Finishing for Beginners.

Involved in personal growth and development 
Involved in the Pathwork process developed by John Pierrakos. From its beginning in the 1960s, Martignoni was present at many of the lectures channeled by Eva Broch Pierrakos. Martignoni explored EST which became Landmark Education in the 1980s and was in charge of assistants in Connecticut. She was a member of the Albertson Memorial Church in Greenwich, Connecticut. As an artist Martignoni sought ways to unite human potential with art. She explored Zen drawing classes with therapist and poet Gunilla Norris and practiced a form of Painting from the Source, as created by Aviva  Gold, with a group of women artists.

Influenced by writers Frederick Franck (The Zen of Seeing), Caroline Myss (Anatomy of Spirit) and Julia Cameron (The Artist’s Way), Martignoni began to use the power of art to connect people with their potential. In 1993 she drew her first Inner Portrait at age 74.

Inner portrait artist 
Martignoni has drawn more than 700 Inner Portraits since 1993. The portraits are in an illustrative style in which people and shapes are easily recognizable with a sub-text of hidden symbols and images. As a self-help technique that incorporates art with personal development, Martignoni developed a process of “reading” the portrait to uncover a story about the subject of the portrait. Making the emotional, spiritual or psychological connection with people is the keystone of the Inner Portrait process.

Martignoni was interviewed on TV by Heather Kovar for News 12 Connecticut in May 2006 and an Inner Portrait drawing was used as the cover art for Natural Awakenings magazine in September 2006.

References

1918 births
2018 deaths
American women illustrators
American illustrators
People from Fairfield, Connecticut
University of the Arts (Philadelphia) alumni
University of Pennsylvania alumni
21st-century American women
People of African-American descent